Kevin Smith (born 29 July 1961) is a former  speedway rider from England.

Speedway career 
Smith reached the final of the British Speedway Championship in 1981. He rode in the top tier of British Speedway from 1978–1987, riding for various clubs.

References 

1961 births
Living people
British speedway riders
Cradley Heathens riders
Hackney Hawks riders
Poole Pirates riders
Rye House Rockets riders
Swindon Robins riders
Weymouth Wildcats riders